Shackelford Miller Jr. (September 4, 1892 – November 24, 1965) was a United States circuit judge of the United States Court of Appeals for the Sixth Circuit and previously was a United States district judge of the United States District Court for the Western District of Kentucky.

Education and career

Born in Louisville, Kentucky, Miller received an Artium Baccalaureus degree from Princeton University in 1914. He received a Bachelor of Laws from Harvard Law School in 1917. He was in private practice of law in Louisville from 1919 to 1939.

Federal judicial service

Miller was nominated by President Franklin D. Roosevelt on February 16, 1939, to a seat on the United States District Court for the Western District of Kentucky vacated by Judge Elwood Hamilton. He was confirmed by the United States Senate on February 20, 1939, and received his commission on March 4, 1939. His service was terminated on December 20, 1945, due to his elevation to the Sixth Circuit.

Miller was nominated by President Harry S. Truman on November 23, 1945, to a seat on the United States Court of Appeals for the Sixth Circuit vacated by Judge Elwood Hamilton. He was confirmed by the Senate on December 4, 1945, and received his commission on December 11, 1945. He served as Chief Judge and as a member of the Judicial Conference of the United States from 1961 to 1962. He assumed senior status on November 1, 1965. His service was terminated on November 24, 1965, due to his death.

References

Sources
 

1892 births
1965 deaths
Princeton University alumni
Harvard Law School alumni
Judges of the United States District Court for the Western District of Kentucky
United States district court judges appointed by Franklin D. Roosevelt
20th-century American judges
Judges of the United States Court of Appeals for the Sixth Circuit
United States court of appeals judges appointed by Harry S. Truman
United States Army officers
Lawyers from Louisville, Kentucky